Rafael Mas Hernández (1950 – January 23, 2003) was a Spanish geographer.

Spanish geographers
Spanish urban planners
1950 births
2003 deaths
20th-century geographers